Ulla Lundholm (born 20 February 1957) is a Finnish athlete. She competed in the women's discus throw at the 1984 Summer Olympics.

References

1957 births
Living people
Athletes (track and field) at the 1984 Summer Olympics
Finnish female discus throwers
Olympic athletes of Finland
Place of birth missing (living people)